Macrauchenia ("long llama", based on the now-invalid llama genus, Auchenia, from Greek  "big neck") was a large, long-necked and long-limbed, three-toed native South American ungulate in the order Litopterna. The genus gives its name to its family, the Macraucheniidae or "robust litopterns". Like other litopterns, it is most closely related to the odd-toed ungulates (Perissodactyla), from which litopterns diverged approximately 66 million years ago. The oldest fossils in the genus date to the late Miocene, around seven million years ago, and M. patachonica disappears from the fossil record during the late Pleistocene, around 20,000-10,000 years ago. M. patachonica is one of the last and best known member of the family and is known primarily from the Luján Formation in Argentina, but is known from localities across southern South America. Another genus of macraucheniid Xenorhinotherium was present in northeast Brazil and Venezuela during the Late Pleistocene. The type specimen was discovered by Charles Darwin during the voyage of the Beagle. In life, Macrauchenia may have resembled a humpless camel, though the two taxa are not closely related. It fed on plants in a variety of environments across what is now South America. Among the species described, M. patachonica and M. ullomensis are considered valid; M. boliviensis is considered a nomen dubium; and M. antiqua (or M. antiquus) has been moved to the genus Promacrauchenia.

Taxonomy 

Macrauchenia fossils were first collected on 9 February 1834 at Port St Julian in Patagonia (Argentina) by Charles Darwin, when HMS Beagle was surveying the port. As a non-expert he tentatively identified the leg bones and fragments of spine he found as "some large animal, I fancy a Mastodon". In 1837, soon after the Beagle's return, the anatomist Richard Owen identified the bones, including vertebrae from the back and neck, as from a gigantic creature resembling a llama or camel, which Owen named Macrauchenia patachonica. The find was one of the discoveries leading to the inception of Darwin's theory. Since then, more Macrauchenia fossils have been found, mainly in Patagonia, but also in Bolivia, Chile and Venezuela.

The related genus Cramauchenia was named by Florentino Ameghino as a deliberate anagram of Macrauchenia.

Evolution 

It is likely that Macrauchenia evolved from earlier litopterns Theosodon, Cramauchenia or Promacrauchenia, or a similar species. Litopterna was one of the five (four in some classifications) ancient orders of endemic South American mammals collectively called meridiungulates. Their relationships with other mammal groups outside South America have been poorly understood, as their early evolutionary history would have been in Western Gondwana, and outside of South America this area is now Antarctica. When South America separated from Antarctica in the Eocene, meridungulate orders survived in South America in isolation. Most flourished in the Paleogene and then diminished. Formerly, North American paleontologists considered them inferior to Northern Hemisphere taxa and to have been outcompeted to extinction in the Great American Biotic Interchange after the establishment of the Central American land bridge. However, more recent evidence shows that three of the meridungulate orders declined long before, just as happened to early mammal groups elsewhere. Litopterns and notoungulates continued, evolving into a variety of more derived forms. While toxodontid notoungulates expanded into North America during the GABI, litopterns remained confined to South America. Macrauchenia was among the last surviving meridungulates, along with litopterns such as Macraucheniopsis, Neolicaphrium, and Xenorhinotherium and the large notoungulates Piauhytherium, Trigodonops, Toxodon, and Mixotoxodon. These last endemic South American hoofed animals died out at the end of the Lujanian (10,000-20,000 years ago).

Sequencing of mitochondrial DNA extracted from an M. patachonica fossil from a cave in southern Chile indicates that Macrauchenia (and by inference, Litopterna) is the sister group to Perissodactyla, with an estimated divergence date of sixty-six million years ago. Analysis of collagen sequences obtained from Macrauchenia and Toxodon reached a similar conclusion and extended membership in the sister group clade to notoungulates.

Description 

Macrauchenia had a somewhat camel-like body, with sturdy legs, a long neck and a relatively small head. Its feet, however, more closely resembled those of a modern rhinoceros, with one central toe and two side toes on each foot.

One striking characteristic of Macrauchenia is the openings for the nostrils on top of the head, above and between the eyes. Increasingly retracted nostrils are an evolutionary trend in later litopterns. Because mammals with trunks show the nostrils in a similar position, a popular hypothesis is that Macrauchenia had a trunk similar to a tapir or an inflated snout like that of the saiga antelope, perhaps to keep dust out of the nostrils.  However, a 2018 study comparing the skulls of tapirs and various other herbivorous extant and extinct mammal species instead saw similarities with the skulls of moose, suggesting that Macrauchenia and other macraucheniids, such as Huayqueriana did not possess trunks. However, pictographs depicting various extinct megafauna dated to around 12,600 to 11,800 years ago from the Serranía de La Lindosa rock formation of Guaviare, Colombia showed what appears to be a possible trunked macraucheniid, presumably Xenorhinotherium.

The snout of Macrauchenia is completely enclosed by bone, and the animal has an elongated neck that allowed it to reach upward; no living mammal with a proboscis has these features. An alternative hypothesis is that these litopterns were high browsers on tough and thorny vegetation, and retracted nostrils allowed them to reach leaves without being impaled in the nose. Sauropod dinosaurs (reconstructed as high browsers on conifer needles and cycads) have similar snouts, and living giraffes and gerenuks, high browsers on thorny vegetation, have more retracted nostrils than related taxa with other feeding habits.

One insight into Macrauchenia'''s habits is that its ankle joints and shin bones may indicate that it was adapted to have unusually good mobility, being able to rapidly change direction when it ran at high speed.Macrauchenia is known, like its relative Theosodon, to have had a full set of 44 teeth.

 Paleobiology Macrauchenia was a herbivore, likely living on leaves from trees or grasses. Carbon isotope analysis of M. patachonica's tooth enamel, as well as analysis of its hypsodonty index (low in this case; i.e., it was brachydont), body size and relative muzzle width suggests that it was a mixed feeder, combining browsing on C3 foliage with grazing on C4 grasses. A dental microwear, occusal enamel, and carbon isotope analysis of Macrauchenia and Xenorhinotherium found that both were grazers on C3 grasses.

The genus was widespread, found in environments that ranged from dry to humid, from southern Chile to northeastern Brazil and the coast of Venezuela. Fossils of M. ullomensis have been found in Bolivia at altitudes up to 4000 meters. Habits and diet may have varied depending on the environment, but in plant feeders an elongated neck is usually an adaptation to allow high browsing on trees and shrubs. As the genus was not confined to forest, it was probably able to exploit more marginal environments by mixing high browsing with low browsing and grazing. A site in northern Chile preserved the remains of five subadults associated together, which suggests Macrauchenia may have lived in large herds or family groups.

When Macrauchenia first arose, it could have been preyed upon by the largest of native South American mammal predators, the sabertoothed sparassodont Thylacosmilus. The largest phorusrhacid birds may also have been able to prey on juveniles. After the GABI, the primary predator on adults would have been the very large sabertoothed cat Smilodon populator and giant short-faced bears. Dire wolves and jaguars may also have hunted Macrauchenia, particularly juveniles.

It is presumed that Macrauchenia dealt with its predators primarily by outrunning them, or, failing that, kicking them with its long, powerful legs. The large size of adults would have limited their vulnerability to most predators. Its potential ability to twist and turn at high speed could have enabled it to evade pursuers; both Thylacosmilus and S. populator were ambush hunters likely unable to run down prey over distance if the prey evaded the first attack.
 Distribution 
Fossils of Macrauchenia'' have been found in:

Miocene
 Epecuén Formation, Argentina

Pliocene
 Argentina

Pleistocene

 Arroyo Seco and Luján Formations, Argentina
 Ulloma, Charana, Umala, Tarija and Ñuapua Formations, Bolivia
 Touro Passo Formation, Brazil
 Cueva del Milodón, Chile
 Paraguay
 San Sebastián Formation, Peru
 Sopas and Dolores Formations, Uruguay
 Taima-Taima, Venezuela

References

Further reading 
 Barry Cox, Colin Harrison, R.J.G. Savage, and Brian Gardiner. (1999): The Simon & Schuster Encyclopedia of Dinosaurs and Prehistoric Creatures: A Visual Who's Who of Prehistoric Life. Simon & Schuster.
 Jayne Parsons. (2001): Dinosaur Encyclopedia. DK.

External links 

 Megafauna page

Macraucheniids
Messinian first appearances
Holocene extinctions
Miocene mammals of South America
Pliocene mammals of South America
Pleistocene mammals of South America
Lujanian
Ensenadan
Uquian
Chapadmalalan
Montehermosan
Huayquerian
Neogene Argentina
Cerro Azul Formation
Pleistocene Argentina
Pleistocene Bolivia
Pleistocene Brazil
Pleistocene Chile
Pleistocene Paraguay
Pleistocene Peru
Pleistocene Uruguay
Pleistocene Venezuela
Fossils of Argentina
Fossils of Bolivia
Fossils of Brazil
Fossils of Chile
Fossils of Paraguay
Fossils of Peru
Fossils of Uruguay
Fossils of Venezuela
Fossil taxa described in 1838
Taxa named by Richard Owen
Prehistoric placental genera